Tenna is a former municipality in the district of Surselva in the canton of Graubünden in Switzerland.  The municipalities of Valendas, Versam, Safien and Tenna merged on 1 January 2013 into the new municipality of Safiental.

History
Tenna is first mentioned in 1398 as Thena.

Coat of arms
The blazon of the municipal coat of arms is Gules St. Valentin clad Argent and caped Or with his dexter raised in blessing and holding in sinister a crosier of the last.   The figure of Valentin von Rätien (an early bishop of Passau) comes from the municipal seal, where he is also represented as a seated figure.

Geography

Of this area, 45.1% is used for agricultural purposes, while 34% is forested. Of the rest of the land, 1.1% is settled (buildings or roads) and the remainder (19.8%) is non-productive (rivers, glaciers or mountains).

The former municipality is located in the Safien sub-district of the Surselva district.  It is a German-speaking collection of small settlements on a terrace above the west side of the Safien valley.  It consists of the village of Tenna which is made up of the sections of Ausserberg, Mitte and Innerberg as well as the hamlets of Acla and Egschi along the valley road.

Demographics
Tenna has a population (as of 2011) of 110.  , 3.9% of the population was made up of foreign nationals. Over the last 10 years the population has decreased at a rate of -19.5%, though it has been increasing since 2000. Most of the population speaks German (98.7%), with the rest speaking Serbo-Croatian (1.3%).

, the gender distribution of the population was 47.4% male and 52.6% female.  The age distribution, in Tenna is; 11 children or 13.9% of the population are between 0 and 9 years old and 8 teenagers or 10.1% are between 10 and 19. Of the adult population, 6 people or 7.6% of the population are between 20 and 29 years old.  10 people or 12.7% are between 30 and 39, 9 people or 11.4% are between 40 and 49, and 13 people or 16.5% are between 50 and 59. The senior population distribution is 8 people or 10.1% of the population are between 60 and 69 years old, 9 people or 11.4% are between 70 and 79, there are 4 people or 5.1% who are between 80 and 89,and there is 1 person who is between 90 and 99.

In the 2007 federal election the most popular party was the SVP which received 54.7% of the vote.  The next three most popular parties were the SP (20.3%), the FDP (14.2%) and the CVP (5.2%).

In Tenna about 74.4% of the population (between age 25–64) have completed either non-mandatory upper secondary education or additional higher education (either university or a Fachhochschule).

Tenna has an unemployment rate of 0%.  , there were 38 people employed in the primary economic sector and about 12 businesses involved in this sector.  No one is employed in the secondary sector and there are no businesses in this sector.  8 people are employed in the tertiary sector, with 4 businesses in this sector.

The historical population is given in the following table:

References

Villages in Graubünden
Former municipalities of Graubünden
Safiental